Hospital People is a BBC One Mockumentary series set in the fictional Brimlington Hospital in the fictional town of Brimlington. The main star of the programme is Tom Binns who plays four different characters in the series. He has a supporting cast of another three actors with guest stars filling in the other roles on an episode-by-episode basis. A pilot episode was shown on BBC One in February 2016, from which a whole series was commissioned and then broadcast in 2017.

Premise
The mockumentary focuses upon the day-to-day running of a hospital set on the coast of Yorkshire. Tom Binns, the co-creator, co-writer and main star of the programme, has said it is based on where he is from on the Yorkshire/Derbyshire border but also on the coast as it is fictional. The programme shows the main characters as a hospital manager and her assistant, a porter, a DJ and his assistant and a hospital chaplain and his organist. Each week a guest star would fulfil a prominent role as part of the main back story to the episode.

Characters
 Susan Mitchell, the hospital manager who is always dreaming up big ideas
 Ian D Montfort, a hospital porter who is also a medium
 Ivan Brackenbury (also known as "The Cheerful Earful"), the DJ on the hospital radio
 Father Kenny Mercer, the hospital chaplain.
All the above are played by Tom Binns. Binns had previously appeared as Brackenbury and Montfort in his stage shows.
 Sunny Prasad (Amit Shah), Susan Mitchell's exasperated assistant
 Mrs Leydon (Janine Duvitski), the chaplains assistant
 Shaz Dutta (Mandeep Dhillon), Ivan the DJ's trainee producer

Guest stars in the first series included Russell Brand, Sally Phillips, James Fleet, Mark Williams, Sian Gibson and Alexander MacQueen.

Episodes

Production
The University Hospital in Hartlepool was used to film both the exterior and the interior shots. The interior sequences used a section of the hospital that were not being used by the NHS at that time and this also generated extra revenue for the University Hospital.

The programme was first profiled on the BBC's Comedy Playhouse medium. The first episode was the pilot which was broadcast in February 2016 and thereafter, the BBC commissioned a series that ran to six episodes and was broadcast from April 2017. The programme was produced by Roughcut productions.

References

External links
 
Clips on the official BBC webpage

2016 British television series debuts
2010s British sitcoms
BBC television sitcoms
English-language television shows